Augustin Aimable Dumon-Dumortier (4 December 1791 – 28 January 1852) was a Belgian industrialist, diplomat and liberal politician.

Life and career
Born at Lille, he was President of the Belgian Senate from 27 June 1848 until 28 January 1852, governor of the province of Hainaut and burgomaster of Tournai. In 1849, he was sent to the Netherlands as a special envoy to congratulate William III upon his coronation. This was 19 years after the Belgian Revolution, which had made an end to the United Kingdom of the Netherlands.

He was a chevalier de l'ordre de Leopold, and he received the Dutch grand-croix de l'ordre de la Couronne de Chêne.

Dumon-Dumortier died at Tournai in 1852.

Honours 
 1849: Knight Grand Cross of the Order of the Oak Crown.

See also
 Liberal Party
 Liberalism in Belgium

References

Sources
, Annuaire statistique et historique belge, Brussel - Leipzig, 1854, pp. 313-315.
Augustin Dumon-Dumortier (D)

1791 births
1852 deaths
Governors of Hainaut (province)
Belgian businesspeople
Politicians from Lille
Presidents of the Senate (Belgium)